Woburn (meaning twisted or crooked stream) is a town and civil parish in Bedfordshire, England. At the 2011 census, it had a population of 933.

History

Woburn was first recorded as a hamlet in 969 and is found in the Domesday Book of 1086. It is best known as the location of Woburn Abbey (a stately home) and Woburn Safari Park. The abbey was founded by Cistercian monks in 1145 and granted to the first Earl of Bedford in 1538 after the dissolution of the monasteries. The town may have been called "Woburne Chapell" in Medieval times, in order to distinguish it from the abbey. Woburn has been burned down and rebuilt three times. A medieval chimney fire spread owing to the prevalence of thatched roofs and closely built houses. Then, during the English Civil War, the Cavaliers burned down much of the town and in 1724 a third fire destroyed much of the town, which was rebuilt in the Georgian style that remains today.

During the nineteenth century, Woburn was an important staging post on the LondonNewport PagnellNorthampton turnpike. The town had 27 inns and the first 24-hour post office outside London. However, with Woburn being bypassed by (what became) the West Coast Main Line and the Grand Union canal (northsouth}} and the Varsity Line (eastwest), Woburn's location ceased to be so significant. The population fell from 2,100 in 1851 to 700 about a century later. 

Woburn Town Hall, designed by Edward Blore, was completed in 1830. Under the 8th Duke of Bedford, a new parish church was completed in Woburn in 1868. It was equipped with a crypt beneath, which was originally intended as the burial place of the Dukes of Bedford and their family. In the end the dukes continued to use the ancient mausoleum at St Michael's, Chenies, and the crypt of St Mary's parish church in Woburn is now used for events and meetings. The hatch through which coffins would have been lowered into the crypt is still visible.

Sports and leisure facilities
Woburn has its own lido (outdoor swimming pool). In addition to the walks and cycling opportunities afforded by the Estate and the local roads, Woburn lies across the routes of both the Greensand Ridge Walk and the Greensand Cycle Way.

Woburn Golf Club, 2.5 miles (4.0 km) west of Woburn, has hosted the Women's British Open eleven times between 1984 and 2019.

Climate
Woburn experiences an oceanic climate (Köppen climate classification Cfb) as is typical of almost all of the United Kingdom.

There is a Met Office weather station in Woburn. In 2010, the temperature fell to

See also
 Center Parcs Woburn Forest ( away, between Millbrook and Steppingley).

References

External links

 Woburn pages at the Bedfordshire and Luton Archives and Records Service
 

 
Towns in Bedfordshire
Civil parishes in Bedfordshire
Central Bedfordshire District